The Schwarzhorn is a mountain of the Lepontine Alps, located on the Swiss-Italian border, between the Binntal (Valais) and the Valle Dèvero (Piedmont). It lies north of the Scherbadung.

The area is renowned for its unique minerals that are found here in a dolomitic host rock. Elements found are typically As, Fe, Pb, Sb.

References

External links
 Schwarzhorn on Hikr

Mountains of the Alps
Mountains of Switzerland
Mountains of Italy
Italy–Switzerland border
International mountains of Europe
Mountains of Valais
Lepontine Alps